First Methodist Episcopal Church (First Methodist Episcopal Church, South; Trinity Methodist Church) is a historic church at 215 Washington Street in Monte Vista, Colorado.

It was built beginning in 1922 and was added to the National Register of Historic Places in 2003. The listing includes a parsonage built in 1901.

References

Methodist churches in Colorado
Churches on the National Register of Historic Places in Colorado
Romanesque Revival church buildings in Colorado
Churches completed in 1922
National Register of Historic Places in Rio Grande County, Colorado
Buildings and structures in Rio Grande County, Colorado